Újpest Football Club is a professional football club based in Újpest district of Budapest, Hungary.

Matches

European record
As of 30 March 2008:

P = matches played, W = won, D = drawn, L = lost, GF = goals for, GA = goals against

In the above table the UEFA Cup row includes 6 appearances in the Inter-Cities Fairs Cup

Club record
As of 3 August 2018
Biggest win: 27/09/1961, Újpest 10-2  Floriana, Budapest
Biggest defeat: 15/09/1998, Újpest 0-5  Club Brugge, Budapest and 29/09/1976, Athletic Bilbao  5-0 Újpest, Bilbao
Appearances in UEFA Champions League:  11
Appearances in UEFA Cup Winners' Cup:  6
Appearances in UEFA Europa League:  13
Player with most UEFA appearances: 41  Ferenc Bene,  Ede Dunai,  András Tóth
Top scorers in UEFA club competitions: 20  Ferenc Bene

References

Hungarian football clubs in international competitions